Saint-Bonnet-le-Château is a commune in the Loire department in central France.

Population

International relations

Saint-Bonnet-le-Château is twinned with:
 Bishop's Waltham, United Kingdom

See also
Communes of the Loire department

References

Communes of Loire (department)